The Taça de Portugal Feminina (english: Women's Cup of Portugal) is an annual association football competition and the premier knockout tournament in Portuguese female football. It was founded in 2003. For sponsorship reasons, it has been known as Taça de Portugal Feminina Allianz. It is disputed from the clubs from the Campeonato Nacional Feminino and the Campeonato Nacional II Divisão Feminino.

The winner will dispute the Supertaça de Futebol Feminino against the first league winners.

1º de Dezembro was the first winner, in the 2003–04 season and holds the record of most wins (7 titles). Sporting CP is the current title holder as they beat F.C. Famalicão in the 2021–22 final.

List of finals
The following is a list of all finals so far.

Performance by club

References

External links
Cup at Federation
Cup at thefinalball.com

Port
Women's football competitions in Portugal
Recurring sporting events established in 2004
Football cup competitions in Portugal
2004 establishments in Portugal